Sara Pinto Sampaio (born 21 July 1991) is a Portuguese model best known for being a Victoria's Secret Angel. Sampaio is a Giorgio Armani beauty ambassador and works for Calzedonia. She was the first Portuguese model in the Sports Illustrated Swimsuit Issue (2014).

Sampaio was named Best Female Model at the Globos de Ouro (Portuguese Golden Globes) in 2011, 2012, 2014, 2015, and 2016. In 2019, Sampaio  was the winner of Fashion Personality of the Year.

Early life 
Sampaio grew up on the outskirts of Porto. After completing high school, Sampaio attended the University of Lisbon.

Career 
Sampaio was first discovered at the age of 15, though she was not allowed to compete in modeling competitions until the age of 16. At 16, she won a hair modeling contest in Portugal called Cabelos Pantene 2007. After the contest, she acted in a commercial in Portugal. Afterward, she was signed up with an agency; however, her parents encouraged her to finish high school before becoming a professional model.

Sampaio's dream was to work for Victoria's Secret. After her agency sent in headshots, she was asked to audition. However, she did not make it to the Fashion Show. She continued to pursue the runway and made her debut in the 2013 Victoria's Secret Fashion Show, where she walked in one segment. During her sophomore performance in 2014, she walked in two segments. In 2015, she was chosen as one of the newest Angels for the 2015 runway, and in December of the same year, she walked for the brand for the first time as an Angel. On 24 October 2016, it was announced that Sara would be walking with the other Angels in the 2016 Fashion Show in Paris, France.

She has been featured prominently in television ads for Axe body spray in the United States. In 2012, she was chosen for the cover of the April edition of Portuguese Vogue and to be the face of the international advertising campaign for Calzedonia Mar, Summer 2012, which was photographed by Raphael Mazzucco in Greece and Jamaica. She was the face of Calzedonia again in 2013, 2014, and 2015. She also appeared in the Replay Fall/Winter 11/12 campaign, alongside Irina Shayk, in the Blumarine Fall/Winter 11/12 campaign, with Adriana Lima ,and in the Armani Fall/Winter 11/12 campaign. In 2013, she appeared in the first edition of the year of the Portuguese GQ, where she was presented as the "eighth wonder of the world". She appeared in Rosa Cha 2013 campaign alongside Barbara Palvin.

On 13 November 2013, she made her debut in the Victoria's Secret Fashion Show 2013. She walked into the Pink segment. She walked the following year in two segments. In 2015, she walked in two segments, for the first year, as an Angel. She has appeared in the 2014 and 2015 editions of the Sports Illustrated Swimsuit edition and won the "Rookie of the year" award in 2014. Sampaio has been on the cover of L'Officiel, Vogue, Marie Claire, Glamour, Elle, Harper's Bazaar, GQ, Telva, etc. In 2015, Maxim honored the 20th anniversary of the brand Victoria's Secret and included Sampaio on the list of "The 20 Most Beautiful Angels of All time".

In May, she got her first cover in the United States, photographed by Gilles Bensimon for Maxim.

Personal life 
In interviews with Vogue, Sampaio discusses being photographed nude, which she finds empowering, and her view of modeling more generally as a form of artistic expression. In the interview, she says "At the end of the day, we were born naked, and that's the way we are gonna go". However, she accused Lui magazine of sexual harassment and bullying her into posing nude for their cover when she requested that her contract stipulate a no-nudity clause. She believes that everyone should feel comfortable in their skin no matter their shape or size. For this reason, Sara has spoken out against skinny shaming and mentioned in an interview that the amount of hate that she and other Victoria's Secret (VS) models experience is ridiculous. She says that "everybody is different and every metabolism is different". The model was part of "The Perfect Body" VS campaign that was later changed to "A Body for Everybody".

Health 
Sampaio has stated on Instagram that she suffers from trichotillomania. She was praised by fans and the media for raising awareness of the little-known condition and has received many messages of support from fellow sufferers.

Relationships 
Since 2015, she has been in a relationship with the entrepreneur Oliver Ripley, who ended their relationship at the end of 2020, due to their professional commitments, since the end of April 2022, she has been with the American producer Zac Frognowski.

Filmography

Film

Television

Music videos

Awards 
 First place, Cabelos Pantene Contest 2007
 Best Female Model, Portuguese Golden Globes 2011
 Best Female Model, Vogue Portugal Fashion Awards 2011
 Best Female Model, Portuguese Golden Globes  2012
 Best Female Model, Vogue Portugal Fashion Awards 2012
 2013 Revelation Model of the Year by ¡Hola! magazine
 Best Female Model, Portuguese Golden Globes  2014
 2014 Rookie of the Year, Sports Illustrated Swimsuit Issue
 Best Female Model, Portuguese Golden Globes 2015
 Best Female Model, Portuguese Golden Globes 2016
Fashion Personality of the Year, Portuguese Golden Globes 2019

References

External links 

 
 
 Sara Sampaio at The Fashion Styles

1991 births
Living people
Portuguese female models
University of Lisbon alumni
People from Porto
Victoria's Secret Angels
Golden Globes (Portugal) winners
The Lions (agency) models
Elite Model Management models